Takanori Sugibayashi (born 14 March 1976) is a retired Japanese triple jumper. His personal best is 17.02 metres, achieved in July 2000 in Sapporo. He has competed at the Olympic Games twice.

Personal best

International competitions

National titles
Japanese Championships
Triple jump: 1997, 1998, 2001, 2003, 2004, 2007, 2009

References

External links

Takanori Sugibayashi at JAAF 
Takanori Sugibayashi at JOC 
Takanori Sugibayashi at Mizuno Track Club  (archived)

1976 births
Living people
Sportspeople from Ishikawa Prefecture
Japanese male triple jumpers
Olympic male triple jumpers
Olympic athletes of Japan
Athletes (track and field) at the 2000 Summer Olympics
Athletes (track and field) at the 2004 Summer Olympics
Asian Games competitors for Japan
Athletes (track and field) at the 1998 Asian Games
World Athletics Championships athletes for Japan
Japan Championships in Athletics winners